The Path of 100 Towers is a multi-day trekking route that begins and ends in the town of Cagliari (Sardinia). The path is named after the 105 historical coastal towers situated along the route.

The path extends throughout the island of Sardinia for a total of 1284 kilometers (798 miles) making it the longest trek in Italy. The trek can be divided into two paths: the eastern path and the western path. The eastern section is characterized by beaches and Mediterranean scrub, from Cagliari to Gallura. The western section traverses ponds, lagoons, and coastal dunes from Castelsardo to Cagliari.

The path runs counterclockwise and consists of eight named stages: Street of Angels; Street of Sarcapos; Street ; Street ; Street ; Street of the Giants, Streets of the Mines and Street of Martyrdom. The estimated time to complete the entire trek varies from 45 to 60 days, depending on the experience and fitness of the walker. The path can also be broken down into shorter itineraries and completed in fewer days.

It has been recognized by the Register of Paths of Sardinia and Religious and Spiritual Itineraries as representing the Sardinian identity, spirit and culture.

The path follows the coastline at an average distance of two kilometers from the shore, crossing beaches, towns, and cities, with extensive views of the Sarninian coastline and hills.

This itinerary is used for a range of outdoor activities, including trekking, hiking, camping, and bike riding.

History
The Path of 100 Towers was created in 2017 and implemented by three Sardinians: Nicola Melis, Roberto Contu, and Stefano Paderi. Nicola Melis drew his inspiration after having walked the Camino de Santiago in Spain with his father in 2013. His idea was to create a similar trek in Sardinia, his country of origin, to increase awareness and encourage the exploration of the island's landscape.

The origins of the route go back to at least the medieval period. From 1600 AD the king of Sardinia, Philiph II sent captain Marco Antonio Camos from Iglesias, to circumnavigate the island on horseback to take a census of the cities and towns of the region. In his report, the captain indicated the points from which to draw the materials for the construction of the towers, the number of soldiers for each, and who should bear the costs for their supply.

The route is dotted with towers and religious buildings which are related to the military and religious history of the Sardinians. There are over 100 towers and about 500 religious sites including sanctuaries and churches.

Trekking routes
The Path of 100 Towers consists of eight sections or "Streets" which can be challenging due to elevation changes in the routes and Sardinia's Mediterranean climate.

Street of Angels

Street of Angels represents the first part of the path and has a total length of 62.4 kilometers. This section starts at the "Tower of " (also known as "Tower of ") and ends in Villasimius. The street takes its name from the Gulf of Angels, where a legend says that at the time of Creation some angels asked God for a portion of land as a gift. In response, God gave them a place, called "The Gulf of Cagliari", where men lived happily with lovd and respect. The path passes through the city port of the Su Siccu's fishermen and continues along the city beach of Poetto, which extends for about eight kilometers to the area, in the municipality of Quartù Saint Elena. It is one of the shortest stages of the trek and includes route finding challenges at crossroads and crossways.

Street Sarcapos

Street Sarcapos is the second stage of the path, which extends for 143 kilometers along the coast of Sarrabus, including the municipalities of Castiadas, Muravera, San Vito, Villaputzu, and Villasimius. These high regions extend to the coast and are characterized by steep slopes, beaches, and small alluvial plains. The main characteristic of this section is the presence of the "Flumendosa", the principal river of Sarrabus. This river is noted for its crystal clear water and is surrounded by dense vegetation in which the scents of strawberry tree, holm oaks, myrtle, mastic, and oaks mix.

Street Ogliastra

The Street Ogliastra is the third section of the 100 Towers Walk and is one of the most arduous of the eight stages. The route crosses several popular coves, such as Cala Goloritzé, Cala Sisine, Cala Luna, and Cala Gonone, characterized by cliffs, caves, and indigenous vegetation. This section also traverses pine forests, mammoth arches, ancient holm oak woods, and old sheepfolds. This section starts at Tertenia, passing through "Sa Pedra Istampada" and the port of Arbatax, from which it climbs gradually towards "Golgo", located in the municipality of Baunei. With a total length of 144 kilometers, this route is considered one of the harder sections due to the lack of water, since water sources are rare, and the few refreshment points along the route are operational only for a few months during the year. It is also noted for the lack of asphalt, limited accommodation facilities, and its visual appeal.

Street Gallura

Street Gallura is the fourth section of the walk, which is characterized by an articulated and jagged path that winds around narrow coastal inlets and granite rocks. It extends from the river Coghinas that delimits it to the west, to the massif of Mount Nieddu to the southeast, in the municipalities of San Teodoro and Budoni. The coast of this stage has numerous islands, including Tavolara and those of the Maddalena archipelago, which make Gallura one of the most famous tourist destinations in Sardinia. The main problems of this stage are the difficulty in finding beaches indicated by the itinerary and the high presence of private land.

Street Catalana

The Street Catalan is the fifth stage of the Path of 100 Towers. It is 238 kilometers long and is one of the longest sections.  The route is characterized by wide beaches and villages of medieval origin of historical and artistic importance such as Castelsardo, Alghero, and Bosa. This section starts from "Castelsardo", a village overlooking the Gulf of Asinara. The path winds through a succession of rocky coastline with small coves, except for the beach of Lu Bagnu. The duration of this walk is about two weeks and it includes the challenge of reaching the island of Asinara. 

Street of the Giants

The Street of the Giants is the sixth stage and consists of a path along the coast that goes from the site of ancient Cornus, an old city-state of Sardinia, founded in the last quarter of the 6th century BC, passing through Tharros, an archeological site of Phoenician origin in the province of Oristano, located in the municipality of Cabras. It finishes in "Neapolis", or New City, an ancient city and one of the most important places on the island.

Street of the Mines

The Street of the Mines is the seventh stage of the Path of 100 Towers and crosses the southwest coast of Sardinia. It traverses the first Geomining Park recognized as a UNESCO World Heritage Site. The name of the street derives from the history of the miners and the workers who lived in Buggerru.  It was also called "Petit Paris" or "little Paris", as the wealthy mining managers who had moved to the mining village with their families had recreated a certain cultural environment. By contrast, the miners worked in poor conditions. They were poorly paid and were forced to work long shifts and were often victims of fatal accidents at work. They were organized by the Federation of Miners.

Street of Martyrdom

The Street of Martyrdom is the eighth and final section of the Path of 100 Towers. It is characterized by its religious associations and it takes its name from the physical union of the sites of the martyrdom of Saint Antioco and Saint Efisio. From the island of San Pietro "Carloforte", the path crosses the island of "Saint Antioco" through "Calasetta" and "Saint Antioco" until it arrives at "Porto Pino". The walk ends in Cagliari, passing through Chia, Pula, and Nora, concluding the Path of 100 Towers after 70 stages and 1284 kilometers.

Towers 
The towers were built along the route between the 1500s and 1700s and strategically situated on the coastline to prevent enemy invasions and incursions by pirates. The distribution of the towers in this way allowed them to communicate with each other using fire, smoke, and bells or by sending warnings with horse messengers. Most towers usually had a circular section at the bottom because of limited financial resources and a lack of building skills. Some of them are now in ruins, while others have been converted into lighthouses or acquired and transformed into private properties.

Types of towers
 Torre De Armas - Gagliarde: this type of tower has a height of 14 meters and a diameter of 17 meters. The towers were governed by a captain and armed with large calibre cannons, rifles, and mortars.
 Senzillas: this type of tower stands 13 meters tall and has a diameter of 10 meters. They were controlled by a commander and a few soldiers, equipped with two cannons and other smaller weaponry.
 Torrezillas: these towers were 5 meters in height and with a diameter of 7 meters. They were located in inaccessible locations with aspects designed to observe approaching enemies.

Main towers 
 Tower of Sa Scafa - Tower Della Quarta Reggia: this tower is located in Cagliari in the locality of "Sa Scafa". It is situated in a strategic position guarding the pond of "Santa Gallia" and the Gulf of Cagliari. It was built under the Aragonese to defend the island from Barbarian incursions. From Spanish times until 1954 fishermen of the pond were required to pay a fee the equivalent of one-fourth of the catch to the royal coffers. The name of the tower derives from this monetary fee. The payment of the fourth part of the catch was also known as arrendu, from the Spanish word "surrender". This practice remained in force until 1956 when it was abolished by regional law.
 Tower of Porto Giunco: it is an Aragonese watchtower, with an average size and an height of 1o meters, located on the East side of the Capo Carbonara promontory in Villasimius and it can be reached on foot from the cove of Porto Giunco or by car from Capo Carbonara. It faces the beach of Porto Giunco and from this tower is it possible to see the Tower of Isola dei Cavoli and the Tower of Saint Luigi.
 Tower of Saint Elia: this semi-ruined tower was built in 1282 on Saint Elia hill, and represents the first and oldest coastal watchtower in Sardinia. This tower has a military defense function and was also used to guide boats for the safest route to the port. After an attempted landing by the French the tower was abandoned in the late XVIII century.
 Tower of Calamosca - Torre Dei Segnali: it is located in the municipality of Cagliari, on the hill of Saint Elia, near the beach of Calamosca and it was built by the Spaniards to fortify Cagliari. It was a senzilla tower and it aim was to sight enemies and to provide a defensive system. It was also called “Signal Tower” due to the signals it sent to the castle of Cagliari to communicate the transit of ships.
 Tower of Marceddì: this is also known as the “Old Tower” to distinguish it from the “New Tower” nearby. It was built in 1580 and was part of the defensive system of the Gulf of Oristano, designed by Don Marcantonio Camos and commissioned by King Philip of Spain to ward off frequent attacks by the Saracens. It was connected to the Tower of Capo Frasca (or Torre Nuova), the Tower Grande, the Torre of Saint Giovanni and the Tower of Capo San Marco
 Tower of Carcangiolas: this tower, also called "Tower Crangiolu", was built on Poetto beach at the end of the XVI century by the Spaniards, in the municipality of Quartu Saint Elena.       During the Second World War, it was restructured for defensive purposes and was used as an observation point. It later became a ruin after a storm, and it was further depleted by marine erosion and the retreat of the coastline in recent years.
 Tower of Poetto: this semi-ruined building is a small coastal tower located on the promontory of the Devil's Saddle in Cagliari. The tower owes its name to the Pouhet, the cockpit near a Roman cistern. The tower was used to communicate with the coastal towers of the Gulf of Cagliari, the Tower of Mezza Spiaggia and the Tower of Isola dei Cavoli.
 Tower of Prezzemolo - Tower of Lazzaretto: it is located near the village of Saint Elia, close to a former hospital of this district of Cagliari, to which it owes its name "Tower of Lazzaretto".       It was built in the first decades of the XVI century but was abandoned in 1638 following the construction of the Tower of Calamosca. The tower's main purpose was to guard over the Gulf of Angels and it could also communicate directly with the castle.

Due to their age, the towers can be found in a variety of conditions and can be divided into three categories: excellent, normal, and poor.

Flora and Fauna  
The Path of 100 Towers crosses two principal types of ecosystems: the typical Mediterranean scrub and lagoon.

Mediterranean scrub 

The Mediterranean scrub is characterized by the abundance of forests and scrub in locations where the Mediterranean climate predominates: dry and arid summers, warm autumns, springs with a lot of rainfall, and mild winters. The area is very sensitive to desertification and vulnerable to forest fires, due to a predominantly arid biome, with xerophytic vegetation (adapted to arid or dry places) and little biodiversity.

Typical flora includes shrub and tree species that have similar characteristics, which make them able to tolerate strong onshore winds, as well as periods of aridity of the land. Myrtle, laurel, rosemary, juniper, and genisteae are the typical plants.

Typical fauna of this ecosystem include a diverse range of mammals, reptiles, birds, amphibians, and insects.

Mammals one can encounter along this route include: fallow deer, wild boars, foxes, and squirrels. There are also various species of reptiles such as turtles, vipers, and lizards.

Lagoon 

The lagoons are characterized by large shallow bodies of both fresh and salt water, separated from the deep waters of the sea by natural barriers formed by sand dunes or coral reefs.

With regards to the flora, this includes the following species: Marsh Samphire (Salicornia herbacea), Sea Blite (Sueda maritima), Reed (Phragmites australis), and Narrowleaf Cattail (Typha angustifolia).

The lagoon is also the habitat of small mammals (rodents and insectivores), insects, small gastropods (e.g. Gibula albida), crustaceans, annelids, water snakes (Natrix natrix), and marsh turtles.

Books 
There are several books and guides specifically about the Path of 100 Towers.  Many of these are in Italian. They include:

 Guida al Cammino 100 Torri (2019)
 Passaporto Del Camminatore (2018)
They are both in Italian and they are written by Nicola Melis.

Curiosities 

 A printed pass called the Pilgrim Passport (Passaporto Del Camminatore) is available for individuals who travel the path. It provides the holder with access to different structures on the route. The pass can also be used to record that the different streets have been completed when a "testimonium" is stamped on it. The certificate of the completion of the total path is given by 8 "testimonium", which are provided by different accommodation structures along the path, stating the date and the place of the stamp. The 8 testimonium are:

 Testimonium Via del Martirio
 Testimonium Via delle Miniere
 Testimonium Via Cataluna
 Testimonium Via Gallura
 Testimonium Via Ogliastra
 Testimonium Via Sarcapos
 Testimonium Via degli Angeli
 Testimonium Sant'Efisio

 In 2013 an association was created, named "Cammino100torri", by a group of individuals that were crossing from Torre Salinas to the "Torre of the Ten Horses".  The members organize meetings with expert guides, and individuals can join organized groups to explore some of the more hidden parts of the path. The association also provides a list of accommodation, fountains, restaurants, and beach bars.

Similar treks 

 Selvaggio Blu (Sardinia)
 "Sentiero dell'Inglesiente" (Sardinia)
 "Cammino di Santa Barbara" (Sardinia)
 "Traversata del Golfo di Orosei" (Sardinia)
 "Path of the Gods" (Amalfi coast)
 "Cammino del Salento" (Puglia)
 "Mediterranean path" (Basilicata)
 "Path 309 of the Mount Conero" (Marche)
 "Montecristo Island" (Tuscany)
 "Blue trail" (Liguria)
 "The path L'infinito" (Liguria)
 "Sentiero di Stromboli" (Sicily)

See also 

 Sardinia
Trekking
Hiking equipment
Cagliari
Gallura
Castelsardo
List of tourist attractions in Sardinia

Gallery

References

External links 
(Italian website) Cammino 100 torri
(Italian website) Sardegna Turismo

Sardinia
Hiking trails in Italy